Sandy Collins , is a Canadian former politician from Newfoundland and Labrador. He represented the district of Terra Nova in the Newfoundland and Labrador House of Assembly from 2009 until 2015. He also served in the provincial cabinet.

Collins entered politics when he won a 2009 by-election in the district of Terra Nova for the Progressive Conservative Party. Following his re-election in the 2011 provincial election he was appointed the Parliamentary Secretary to the Minister of Health and Community Services. He lost re-election in the 2015 provincial election.

Early life and education
Upon finishing high school in 1996 Collins attended Memorial University. He graduated in 2001 with a Bachelor of Arts degree with a double major in Political Science and History. Collins then accepted a one-year teaching position in South Korea and as a result of that experience he returned to university and received a Bachelor of Education degree in 2003. He returned to South Korea after completing his third degree and in 2004 Collins returned to Newfoundland and Labrador to work as Constituency Assistant to Paul Oram.

Politics
Collins is a member of the Progressive Conservative Party and won his seat in a by-election on November 26, 2009 for the district of Terra Nova. In the 2011 provincial election Collins was easily elected, winning over 63% of the popular vote. Following his re-election Premier Kathy Dunderdale appointed him as the Parliamentary Secretary to the Minister of Health and Community Services.

On May 1, 2014, Collins was appointed Minister of Tourism, Culture and Recreation by Premier Tom Marshall.

He lost re-election in the 2015 provincial election

Electoral record

 
|NDP
|Bert Blundon
|align="right"|763
|align="right"|
|align="right"|
|}

|-

|-

|NDP
|Robin Brentnall
|align="right"|648
|align="right"|14.69%
|align="right"|
|-

|-

|Independent
|John Baird
|align="right"|346
|align="right"|7.85%
|align="right"|
|}

}

 
|NDP
|Robin Brentnall
|align="right"|297
|align="right"|6.81%
|align="right"|
|}

References

External links
Sandy Collins' PC Party biography

1978 births
Living people
Members of the Executive Council of Newfoundland and Labrador
People from Newfoundland (island)
Progressive Conservative Party of Newfoundland and Labrador MHAs
21st-century Canadian politicians